Actavis Generics (formerly known as Watson Pharmaceuticals and Actavis plc, prior to the acquisition of Irish-based Allergan Inc) is a global pharmaceutical company focused on acquiring, developing, manufacturing and marketing branded pharmaceuticals, generic and over-the-counter medicines, and biologic products. Actavis has a commercial presence across approximately 100 countries. The company has global headquarters in Dublin, Ireland and administrative headquarters in Parsippany-Troy Hills, New Jersey, United States.

Actavis PLC markets brand products through six franchises in key therapeutic categories including: Aesthetics/Dermatology/Plastic Surgery; Neurosciences/CNS; Eye Care; Women's Health and Urology; GI and Cystic Fibrosis; and Cardiovascular Disease and Infectious Disease. The company's products include Botox, Namenda, Restasis, Linzess, Bystolic, Juvederm, Latisse, Lo Loestrin Fe, Estrace, Teflaro, Dalvance, Ozurdex, Optive, Natrelle, Viibryd, Liletta, Saphris, Enablex, Actonel, Androderm, Gelnique and others.

Actavis PLC also operates the world's third-largest generics business. The company has been ranked in the top 3 in 12 global markets, the top 5 in 16 global markets, and in the top 10 in 33 global markets. Actavis also develops and out-licenses generic pharmaceutical products outside the US through its Medis third-party business, the world's largest generic pharmaceutical out-licensing business. Medis has more than 300 customers globally, and offers more than 200 products. Actavis PLC is also developing biosimilars products in oncology and other therapeutic categories, and currently has five biosimilar products in development. Actavis PLC has more than 40 manufacturing and distribution facilities around the world, with a capacity of approximately 40 billion units annually. Actavis Global Operations also included Anda Inc, the fourth-largest US generic pharmaceutical product distributor in the United States.

On June 15, 2015, Actavis plc changed its name to Allergan plc, but the company's U.S. and Canadian generics business will continue to operate under the Actavis name.  In July 2015, Allergan PLC announced it would sell its Generics division of the company, including Anda Inc, to Teva Pharmaceuticals for $40.5 billion, a transaction proposed for completion by the first quarter of 2016.

History
The company was founded in the spring of 1983, when, with funding from friends and family, colleagues Allen Chao, Ph.D. and David Hsia, Ph.D., began a small drug development enterprise. Just two months later, the founders established an initial product-development and analytical laboratory with six employees (including both founders) in a leased space in Libertyville, Illinois (U.S.).

By late fall of the same year, the company moved to Southern California into an initial 2,000-square-foot (190 m2) leased facility in Corona, and the development and manufacturing of generic pharmaceuticals began. The Corona site became the corporate headquarters for the rapidly expanding US company.

Company evolution

1990s
Throughout its history, Actavis has expanded both organically and as the result of strategic acquisitions. In 1993, Actavis, then Watson, announced its initial public offering (IPO) of shares of common stock. The company was initially listed on the NASDAQ under the ticker symbol WATS. The company moved to the New York Stock Exchange (NYSE) in 1997, and began trading under the symbol WPI.

2000 to 2009
In 2000, the company acquired Schein Pharmaceutical Inc, an acquisition that more than doubled the company's size. In that same year, the group reported revenues in excess of $1 billion. In the fall of 2006, it acquired Andrx Corporation, a Fort Lauderdale, FL–based pharmaceutical company, making it the third largest specialty pharmaceutical company based on total prescriptions dispensed. In 2007, Dr. Allen Chao retired as President and Chief Executive Officer (CEO) and was succeeded by Paul M. Bisaro. The company's international presence began with the acquisition of the Arrow Group in 2009, providing the company with commercial presence in more than 20 international markets. As a result of the Arrow acquisition, the company also acquired the biopharmaceutical development organization Eden Biodesign in Liverpool, UK.

2011 to 2014
In 2011, Watson moved its corporate headquarters from Corona, California to Parsippany, New Jersey. The new LEED-certified corporate headquarters at the Morris Corporate Center in Parsippany was formally dedicated on June 9, 2011.

Actavis acquisition and Watson name change
Following the acquisition, Watson adopted Actavis' name for its global operations.

Warner Chilcott PLC acquisition
On October 1, 2013, Actavis acquired Irish pharmaceutical company Warner Chilcott PLC (previously known as Galen) in a stock-for-stock transaction valued at approximately $8.5 billion. The combination created a company with approximately $10 billion in anticipated combined annual 2013 revenue, and the third-largest US specialty pharmaceutical company with approximately $3 billion in annual revenue focused on the core therapeutic categories of women's health, urology, gastroenterology and dermatology. In association with the merger the company relocated its corporate headquarters to Ireland while maintaining its operational headquarters in Parsippany, taking advantage of the lower (17% vs. 35% in the United States) Irish corporate tax rate. This deal inspired a series of similar moves by other drug companies and led to new Treasury Department regulations limiting the ability of companies to perform such inversions, although Actavis was exempt from these regulations as its move abroad had already been completed. CEO Paul Bisaro stated that in making the inversion, they were trying to "level the playing field" given the high corporate tax rate in the United States.

Forest Laboratories acquisition
On July 1, 2014, Actavis announced that it had completed its acquisition of Forest Laboratories (who previously acquired, Furiex Pharmaceuticals Inc and Aptalis Pharma) in a cash and equity transaction valued at approximately $25 billion. Following the acquisition, the company restructured its executive leadership, with Paul Bisaro being named Executive Chairman, and Brent Saunders being appointed CEO and President of the combined organization.

Allergan Inc acquisition and Actavis PLC name change
In November 2014, Actavis PLC announced its intention to acquire Allergan Inc, the manufacturer of Botox. Completion of the deal would increase its market capitalization to $147 billion. On March 17, 2015, Actavis PLC completed the acquisition of Allergan Inc in a cash and equity transaction valued at approximately $70.5 billion. The combination created a $23 billion diversified global pharmaceutical company with commercial reach across 100 countries. In June 2015, Actavis PLC officially changed its name to Allergan PLC.

United Kingdom price fixing controversy
In December 2016, the company was accused of breaking competition law by “charging excessive and unfair prices” by the Competition and Markets Authority.  It was alleged that the company had increased the price of hydrocortisone tablets by more than 12,000% over the course of eight years.  It sold about 943,000 packets of the tablets to the National Health Service in 2015.  10 mg hydrocortisone tablets which were sold for 79p in April 2008 were £88 per pack by March 2016.  20 mg hydrocortisone tablets in March 2008 were sold for £1.07 but £102.74 in 2016.  From 2008 to 2015, NHS expenditure on the drug rose from £522,000 to £70 million.

Locations and facilities

Global headquarters
The company's global headquarters are located in Dublin, Ireland and administrative headquarters are located in Parsippany, New Jersey, US.

Manufacturing facilities
The company has 40 manufacturing facilities in five continents providing the company with a core leadership position in modified release products, solid oral dosages, transdermals, semi-solids, liquids and injectables. The company's manufacturing facilities are located in Belgium, Brazil, Bulgaria, Canada, China, France, Germany, Greece, Iceland, India, Indonesia, Ireland, Northern-Ireland, Italy, Malta, Puerto Rico, Romania, Singapore, Serbia, Thailand, the UK and the US.

Research and development facilities
Actavis PLC has 27 global R&D facilities focusing on the development of modified release products, solid oral dosages, transdermals, semi-solids, liquids and injectables around the world. The company's R&D facilities are located in Belgium, Bulgaria, China, France, Iceland, Italy, India, Indonesia, Ireland, Japan, Romania, the UK and the US.

In popular culture
Due to their production of "Promethazine With Codeine Cough Syrup", the main ingredient in recreational drug nicknamed 'purple drank', the brand has been name-dropped by multiple well known hip-hop artists. Actavis discontinued production of the syrup in 2014. Many rappers, such as Chief Keef and Future mention this cough syrup in their music.

References

External links

Companies formerly listed on the New York Stock Exchange
Companies based in Morris County, New Jersey
Parsippany-Troy Hills, New Jersey
Pharmaceutical companies based in New Jersey
1984 establishments in Illinois
Pharmaceutical companies established in 1984
Manufacturing companies based in Dublin (city)
Generic drug manufacturers
Tax inversions
Pharmaceutical companies of Ireland
2016 mergers and acquisitions